Delitschøya is an island off Andréetangen at the eastern side of Tjuvfjorden, at Edgeøya, Svalbard. It is located nearby the island Zieglerøya. The island is named after geographer Otto Delitsch.

References

Islands of Svalbard